Anita Sethi is a British journalist and writer, who was born in Manchester, England.

Sethi has written for The Guardian, The Observer, The Sunday Times, The Independent, the New Statesman, Granta, and The Times Literary Supplement. In broadcasting she has appeared as a critic, commentator and presenter on several BBC programmes and is a regular speaker and chair at festivals in the UK and internationally. She has been published in anthologies including From There to Here, Roads Ahead, and Solstice Shorts. She has been an International Writer in Residence at the Emerging Writers' Festival in Melbourne, Australia.

Sethi is the author of the memoir I Belong Here: A Journey Along the Backbone of Britain, published in 2021. In 2021 I Belong Here was shortlisted for the Wainwright Prize in the Nature Writing category.

References

External links

Living people
British journalists
British writers
Year of birth missing (living people)
British writers of Indian descent